Hormisdas Langlais was a Canadian politician and a seven-term Member of the Legislative Assembly of Quebec.
He was born on September 2, 1890 in Saint-Octave-de-Métis, Bas-Saint-Laurent.

Langlais ran as an Action libérale nationale (ALN) candidate in the 1935 election and lost.  He was elected as a Union Nationale candidate in the 1936 election against Liberal incumbent Amédée Caron in the provincial district of Îles-de-la-Madeleine.  He was re-elected in the 1939, 1944, 1948, 1952, 1956 and 1960 elections.

He was appointed House Whip in 1944 and served as a parliamentary assistant from 1955 to 1960.  He was defeated against Liberal candidate Louis-Philippe Lacroix in the 1962 election.

Langlais died on April 6, 1976 in Quebec City.

References

1890 births
1976 deaths
People from Bas-Saint-Laurent
Union Nationale (Quebec) MNAs